Ficicis despectus, is a species of weevil native to Oriental region and eastwards to New Guinea, Australia and the Solomon Islands.

References 

Curculionidae
Insects of Sri Lanka
Beetles described in 1859